Yozgat Museum is a museum in Yozgat, Turkey.

The museum building is an old mansion named Nizamoğlu Mansion. It was built in 1871. The mansion was purchased by the Ministry of Culture in 1979. After a restoration period it was opened as a museum in 1985.

In the museum there are both ethnographic and archaeological items. Among the ethnographic items there are hand written manuscripts, local clothing, carpets, kitchen and everyday tools, wooden artifacts and weapons. Sculptures, sarcophagi, coins, stamps and inscriptions make up the archaeological section. There are over 2800 ethnographic and  1640 archaeological items in the museum.

References

Buildings and structures in Yozgat Province
Tourist attractions in Yozgat Province
Museums in Turkey
Museums established in 1985
1985 establishments in Turkey